Original Child Bomb is a 2004 documentary about the aftermath of the atomic bombings of Hiroshima and Nagasaki.  The film premiered at the 2004 Tribeca Film Festival and was aired on many stations on August 6, 2005, the 60th anniversary of the bombings.  The title of the film was inspired by Thomas Merton's poem of the same name, which is quoted throughout the film.

The documentary employs color footage that had previously been labeled top secret by the US government.  The 2005 airing of Original Child Bomb was the most extensive exposure to date of this footage in the United States.  It had been filmed by both the United States military and Japanese camera crews.

Original Child Bomb was directed by Carey McKenzie and produced by Holly Becker.

Synopsis 

Original Child Bomb begins with a recreation of the dropping of Little Boy from the perspective of Hiroshima's residents. It is joined with both historical and contemporary footage and overlaid with various voice-overs.  The documentary moves on to offer the accounts of several Japanese witnesses of the atomic bombing destruction.

The final part of the documentary consists of interviews with American students in a modern classroom setting.  Much of the film is presented in a montage style.

Title 

The title of the film comes from Thomas Merton's poem of the same name, Original Child Bomb.  The phrase "original child bomb" was derived from the Japanese term for the atom bomb, genshi bakudan.  Genshi, which means "atom," contains root characters which, when rendered individually, can be taken to mean "original" and "child."  Merton's poem claims, as does the documentary, that the Japanese called the weapon the "original child bomb" because the bomb was the first of its kind. It is unlikely, however, that native Japanese speakers would have translated genshi as such, or that the phrase "original child bomb" was ever used by the Japanese.

Awards 

At the 2004 AFI-Discovery Channel Silverdocs Documentary Festival, Original Child Bomb won the Sterling Award along with Death in Gaza.
Grand Jury Prize winner at Bologna Human Rights Nights 2004.

References

External links 

 

Documentary films about the atomic bombings of Hiroshima and Nagasaki
2004 documentary films
2004 films
2000s English-language films